The 2022–23 Nedbank Cup is the 2022–23 edition of South Africa's premier knockout club football (soccer) competition, the Nedbank Cup. It is the 51st consecutive season of the competition, and 16th under its current sponsor.

The winner will qualify for the 2023–24 CAF Confederation Cup.

Participating Teams

Teams 
The Following 32 teams are the teams that qualified and will take part in current competition of the Nedbank Cup.

Preliminary round 
16 teams from SAFA Leagues (National First Division and SAFA Second Division) played the preliminary round to qualify for the Round of 32.

Round of 32

Round of 16 
Dondol Stars
Mamelodi Sundowns
Marumo Gallants
Sekhukhune United
Orlando Pirates
Venda football Academy
Kaizer Chiefs F.C.
Stellenbosch F.C.

Quarter-finals 
Mamelodi Sundowns
Dondol stars
Stellenbosch F.C.
Royal AM
Orlando Pirates F.C.
Chippa United
Kaizer Chiefs F.C.
Sekhukhune United

Semi-finals

Final

Statistics

Top Goal Scorer

Hat-Tricks

References
 

2022–23 in South African soccer
Nedbank Cup